The weightlifting competition at the 1936 Summer Olympics in Berlin consisted of five weight classes, all for men only.

Medal summary

Medal table

References

Sources
 
 

 
1936 Summer Olympics events
1936